The 2023 Boston Red Sox season will be the 123rd season in Boston Red Sox franchise history, and their 112th season at Fenway Park. The team is led by Alex Cora, in the third season of his second stint as the team's manager.

The Red Sox are scheduled to begin their regular season on March 30, in a home game against the Baltimore Orioles, and finish on October 1, in a road game at Baltimore.

Offseason
The team entered the offseason with the status of several players, most notably Xander Bogaerts, unclear due to expiring contracts or opt-out clauses.

October 2022
 On October 11, the team claimed catcher Caleb Hamilton off waivers from the Minnesota Twins; in a corresponding move, outfielder Abraham Almonte was designated for assignment. Almonte subsequently elected to become a free agent.
 On October 13, the team claimed pitcher Jake Reed off waivers from the Baltimore Orioles; in a corresponding move, pitcher Eduard Bazardo was designated for assignment. Bazardo later elected to become a free agent.
 On October 31, pitcher Tyler Danish elected minor-league free agency, after being placed on waivers and removed from the 40-man roster by the team.

November 2022
 On November 6, the following players elected free agency: Nathan Eovaldi, Rich Hill, J. D. Martinez, Matt Strahm, and Michael Wacha.
 On November 7, Xander Bogaerts elected free agency.
 On November 8, the team announced that pitcher James Paxton exercised his $4 million option to remain a member of the Red Sox for the 2023 season.
 On November 9, the team traded pitcher Easton McGee to the Seattle Mariners for cash.
 On November 10, the Red Sox announced that both the team and outfielder Tommy Pham declined a mutual option, making him a free agent.
 On November 10, the team selected the contract of infielder Enmanuel Valdez from the Worcester Red Sox.
 On November 15, the team designated two players for assignment—Caleb Hamilton and Jake Reed—and added five players to the 40-man roster: Wilyer Abreu, David Hamilton, Ceddanne Rafaela, Chris Murphy, and ‎Brandon Walter. Reed was later claimed off waivers by the Los Angeles Dodgers.
 On November 16, bench coach Will Venable left the team to join the Texas Rangers as associate manager.
 On November 18, the team non-tendered Yu Chang and Franchy Cordero, making both players free agents.
 On November 23, the team signed free-agent left-handed pitcher Joely Rodríguez to a one-year contract with a club option for 2024.
 On November 23, the team acquired infielder Hoy Park from the Pittsburgh Pirates in exchange for minor-league left-handed pitcher Inmer Lobo.
 On November 29, the team promoted Ramón Vázquez to bench coach.
 On November 30, the team announced a 10-year agreement with MassMutual; the agreement includes the team wearing MassMutual uniform patches, and MassMutual signage at Fenway Park.

December 2022

 On December 2, the team sent catcher Ronaldo Hernández outright to Worcester, removing him from the 40-man roster.
 On December 7, minor-league pitcher Thad Ward—a fifth-round selection by Boston during the 2018 MLB draft—was selected by the Washington Nationals with the first pick of the 2022 Rule 5 draft. Also selected from Boston's minor-league system were pitchers Andrew Politi by the Baltimore Orioles and Noah Song by the Philadelphia Phillies.
 On December 8, the team signed free-agent pitcher Chris Martin to a two-year contract.
 On December 9, free-agent Xander Bogaerts, who had played 10 seasons with Boston, signed with the San Diego Padres.
 On December 13, the team signed free-agent reliever Kenley Jansen to a two-year contract; in a corresponding move, Hoy Park was designated for assignment. Park was subsequently traded to the Atlanta Braves for a player to be named later or cash considerations.
 On December 15, the team signed outfielder Masataka Yoshida, previously with the Orix Buffaloes of Nippon Professional Baseball (NPB), to a five-year contract; in a corresponding move, infielder Jeter Downs was designated for assignment. Downs was later claimed by the Washington Nationals.
 On December 16, the team acquired relief pitcher Wyatt Mills from the Kansas City Royals in exchange for minor-league pitcher Jacob Wallace. In a corresponding move, the Red Sox designated Eric Hosmer for assignment. Hosmer was released on December 22.
 On December 27, free-agent Nathan Eovaldi, who had spent the prior five seasons with Boston, signed with the Texas Rangers.

January 2023

 On January 3, the team and Rafael Devers agreed to terms on a one-year contract, avoiding salary arbitration.
 On January 4, the team named former MLB outfielder Kyle Hudson as first base coach and outfield instructor.
 On January 6, the team signed Justin Turner to a one-year contract; in a corresponding move, pitcher Darwinzon Hernández was designated for assignment.
 On January 10, the team announced that Trevor Story underwent surgery on his right ulnar collateral ligament (elbow), and that he would miss at least part of the 2023 season.
 On January 11, Darwinzon Hernández was traded to the Baltimore Orioles in exchange for cash considerations.
 On January 11, the team announced a 10-year contract extension, worth $331 million, with Rafael Devers.
 On January 12, the team signed pitcher Corey Kluber to a one-year contract for the 2023 season, with an option for 2024; in a corresponding move, pitcher Connor Seabold was designated for assignment. Seabold was subsequently traded to the Colorado Rockies.
 On January 13, the team reached agreement on one-year contracts with five players, avoiding salary arbitration: Christian Arroyo, Ryan Brasier, Reese McGuire, Nick Pivetta, and Alex Verdugo.
 On January 24, the team traded pitcher Josh Taylor to the Kansas City Royals in exchange for shortstop Adalberto Mondesí and a player to be named later.
 On January 24, the team signed outfielder Adam Duvall to a one-year contract; in a corresponding move, pitcher Matt Barnes was designated for assignment.
 On January 30, Barnes was traded to the Miami Marlins in exchange for relief pitcher Richard Bleier; in a corresponding move, relief pitcher Frank German was designated for assignment. German was later traded to the Chicago White Sox for minor-league pitcher Theo Denlinger.

February 2023
 On February 16, the team signed infielder Yu Chang to a one year contract; in a corresponding roster move, Trevor Story was placed on the 60-day injured list.

Spring training
"Truck day", when the tractor-trailer carrying the team's equipment departs Fenway Park for Florida, was February 3. The Red Sox had their first spring training game on February 24, a 5–3 exhibition win over the Northeastern Huskies at JetBlue Park. Boston's Grapefruit League schedule features 18 home games and 16 away games. The Red Sox defeated Team Puerto Rico, 9–3, in an exhibition game on March 8. Kiké Hernández, while slated to be the Red Sox' regular shortstop, played center field for Puerto Rico. The Red Sox' preseason is set to conclude on March 28.

Regular season
For the first time, MLB scheduled each team in the league to play every other team in the league during the regular season, resulting in Boston facing National League (NL) teams 46 times, compared to 20 times under prior scheduling. The team's schedule was constructed by MLB as follows:

 13 games  4 AL East teams (Yankees, Blue Jays, Orioles, Rays) = 52 games
 7 games  4 AL teams (Astros, Royals, Angels, Twins) = 28 games
 6 games  6 AL teams (White Sox, Guardians, Tigers, Athletics, Mariners, Rangers) = 36 games
 4 games  1 NL team (Braves) = 4 games
 3 games  14 NL teams (all other NL teams) = 42 games
Total:  games

Season standings

American League East

American League Wild Card

Game Log

|- style="text-align:center; background-color:#f7e1d7;"
| 1 || March 30 || Orioles || – || || || — || Fenway Park || || – || 
|- style="text-align:center; background-color:#f7e1d7;"
| 2 || April 1 || Orioles || – || || || — || Fenway Park || || – ||
|- style="text-align:center; background-color:#f7e1d7;"
| 3 || April 2 || Orioles || – || || || — || Fenway Park || || – ||
|- style="text-align:center; background-color:#f7e1d7;"
| 4 || April 3 || Pirates || – || || || — || Fenway Park || || – ||
|- style="text-align:center; background-color:#f7e1d7;"
| 5 || April 4 || Pirates || – || || || — || Fenway Park || || – ||
|- style="text-align:center; background-color:#f7e1d7;"
| 6 || April 5 || Pirates || – || || || — || Fenway Park || || – ||
|- style="text-align:center; background-color:
| 7 || April 6 || @ Tigers || – || || || — || Comerica Park || || – ||
|- style="text-align:center; background-color:
| 8 || April 8 || @ Tigers || – || || || — || Comerica Park || || – ||
|- style="text-align:center; background-color:
| 9 || April 9 || @ Tigers || – || || || — || Comerica Park || || – ||
|- style="text-align:center; background-color:
| 10 || April 10 || @ Rays || – || || || — || Tropicana Field || || – ||
|- style="text-align:center; background-color:
| 11 || April 11 || @ Rays || – || || || — || Tropicana Field || || – ||
|- style="text-align:center; background-color:
| 12 || April 12 || @ Rays || – || || || — || Tropicana Field || || – ||
|- style="text-align:center; background-color:
| 13 || April 13 || @ Rays || – || || || — || Tropicana Field || || – ||
|- style="text-align:center; background-color:#f7e1d7;"
| 14 || April 14 || Angels || – || || || — || Fenway Park || || – ||
|- style="text-align:center; background-color:#f7e1d7;"
| 15 || April 15 || Angels || – || || || — || Fenway Park || || – ||
|- style="text-align:center; background-color:#f7e1d7;"
| 16 || April 16 || Angels || – || || || — || Fenway Park || || – ||
|- style="text-align:center; background-color:#f7e1d7;"
| 17 || April 17 || Angels || – || || || — || Fenway Park || || – ||
|- style="text-align:center; background-color:#f7e1d7;"
| 18 || April 18 || Twins || – || || || — || Fenway Park || || – ||
|- style="text-align:center; background-color:#f7e1d7;"
| 19 || April 19 || Twins || – || || || — || Fenway Park || || – ||
|- style="text-align:center; background-color:#f7e1d7;"
| 20 || April 20 || Twins || – || || || — || Fenway Park || || – ||
|- style="text-align:center; background-color:
| 21 || April 21 || @ Brewers || – || || || — || American Family Field || || – ||
|- style="text-align:center; background-color:
| 22 || April 22 || @ Brewers || – || || || — || American Family Field || || – ||
|- style="text-align:center; background-color:
| 23 || April 23 || @ Brewers || – || || || — || American Family Field || || – ||
|- style="text-align:center; background-color:
| 24 || April 24 || @ Orioles || – || || || — || Camden Yards || || – ||
|- style="text-align:center; background-color:
| 25 || April 25 || @ Orioles || – || || || — || Camden Yards || || – ||
|- style="text-align:center; background-color:
| 26 || April 26 || @ Orioles || – || || || — || Camden Yards || || – ||
|- style="text-align:center; background-color:#f7e1d7;"
| 27 || April 28 || Guardians || – || || || — || Fenway Park || || – ||
|- style="text-align:center; background-color:#f7e1d7;"
| 28 || April 29 || Guardians || – || || || — || Fenway Park || || – ||
|- style="text-align:center; background-color:#f7e1d7;"
| 29 || April 30 || Guardians || – || || || — || Fenway Park || || – ||
|-

|- style="text-align:center; background-color:#f7e1d7;"
| 30 || May 1 || Blue Jays || – || || || — || Fenway Park || || – ||
|- style="text-align:center; background-color:#f7e1d7;"
| 31 || May 2 || Blue Jays || – || || || — || Fenway Park || || – ||
|- style="text-align:center; background-color:#f7e1d7;"
| 32 || May 3 || Blue Jays || – || || || — || Fenway Park || || – ||
|- style="text-align:center; background-color:#f7e1d7;"
| 33 || May 4 || Blue Jays || – || || || — || Fenway Park || || – ||
|- style="text-align:center; background-color:
| 34 || May 5 || @ Phillies || – || || || — || Citizens Bank Park || || – ||
|- style="text-align:center; background-color:
| 35 || May 6 || @ Phillies || – || || || — || Citizens Bank Park || || – ||
|- style="text-align:center; background-color:
| 36 || May 7 || @ Phillies || – || || || — || Citizens Bank Park || || – ||
|- style="text-align:center; background-color:
| 37 || May 9 || @ Braves || – || || || — || Truist Park || || – ||
|- style="text-align:center; background-color:
| 38 || May 10 || @ Braves || – || || || — || Truist Park || || – ||
|- style="text-align:center; background-color:#f7e1d7;"
| 39 || May 12 || Cardinals || – || || || — || Fenway Park || || – ||
|- style="text-align:center; background-color:#f7e1d7;"
| 40 || May 13 || Cardinals || – || || || — || Fenway Park || || – ||
|- style="text-align:center; background-color:#f7e1d7;"
| 41 || May 14 || Cardinals || – || || || — || Fenway Park || || – ||
|- style="text-align:center; background-color:#f7e1d7;"
| 42 || May 15 || Mariners || – || || || — || Fenway Park || || – ||
|- style="text-align:center; background-color:#f7e1d7;"
| 43 || May 16 || Mariners || – || || || — || Fenway Park || || – ||
|- style="text-align:center; background-color:#f7e1d7;"
| 44 || May 17 || Mariners || – || || || — || Fenway Park || || – ||
|- style="text-align:center; background-color:
| 45 || May 19 || @ Padres || – || || || — || Petco Park || || – ||
|- style="text-align:center; background-color:
| 46 || May 20 || @ Padres || – || || || — || Petco Park || || – ||
|- style="text-align:center; background-color:
| 47 || May 21 || @ Padres || – || || || — || Petco Park || || – ||
|- style="text-align:center; background-color:
| 48 || May 22 || @ Angels || – || || || — || Angel Stadium || || – ||
|- style="text-align:center; background-color:
| 49 || May 23 || @ Angels || – || || || — || Angel Stadium || || – ||
|- style="text-align:center; background-color:
| 50 || May 24 || @ Angels || – || || || — || Angel Stadium || || – ||
|- style="text-align:center; background-color:
| 51 || May 26 || @ Diamondbacks || – || || || — || Chase Field || || – ||
|- style="text-align:center; background-color:
| 52 || May 27 || @ Diamondbacks || – || || || — || Chase Field || || – ||
|- style="text-align:center; background-color:
| 53 || May 28 || @ Diamondbacks || – || || || — || Chase Field || || – ||
|- style="text-align:center; background-color:#f7e1d7;"
| 54 || May 30 || Reds || – || || || — || Fenway Park || || – ||
|- style="text-align:center; background-color:#f7e1d7;"
| 55 || May 31 || Reds || – || || || — || Fenway Park || || – ||
|-

|- style="text-align:center; background-color:#f7e1d7;"
| 56 || June 1 || Reds || – || || || — || Fenway Park || || – ||
|- style="text-align:center; background-color:#f7e1d7;"
| 57 || June 2 || Rays || – || || || — || Fenway Park || || – ||
|- style="text-align:center; background-color:#f7e1d7;"
| 58 || June 3 || Rays || – || || || — || Fenway Park || || – ||
|- style="text-align:center; background-color:#f7e1d7;"
| 59 || June 4 || Rays || – || || || — || Fenway Park || || – ||
|- style="text-align:center; background-color:#f7e1d7;"
| 60 || June 5 || Rays || – || || || — || Fenway Park || || – ||
|- style="text-align:center; background-color:
| 61 || June 6 || @ Guardians || – || || || — || Progressive Field || || – ||
|- style="text-align:center; background-color:
| 62 || June 7 || @ Guardians || – || || || — || Progressive Field || || – ||
|- style="text-align:center; background-color:
| 63 || June 8 || @ Guardians || – || || || — || Progressive Field || || – ||
|- style="text-align:center; background-color:
| 64 || June 9 || @ Yankees || – || || || — || Yankee Stadium || || – ||
|- style="text-align:center; background-color:
| 65 || June 10 || @ Yankees || – || || || — || Yankee Stadium || || – ||
|- style="text-align:center; background-color:
| 66 || June 11 || @ Yankees || – || || || — || Yankee Stadium || || – ||
|- style="text-align:center; background-color:#f7e1d7;"
| 67 || June 12 || Rockies || – || || || — || Fenway Park || || – ||
|- style="text-align:center; background-color:#f7e1d7;"
| 68 || June 13 || Rockies || – || || || — || Fenway Park || || – ||
|- style="text-align:center; background-color:#f7e1d7;"
| 69 || June 14 || Rockies || – || || || — || Fenway Park || || – ||
|- style="text-align:center; background-color:#f7e1d7;"
| 70 || June 16 || Yankees || – || || || — || Fenway Park || || – ||
|- style="text-align:center; background-color:#f7e1d7;"
| 71 || June 17 || Yankees || – || || || — || Fenway Park || || – ||
|- style="text-align:center; background-color:#f7e1d7;"
| 72 || June 18 || Yankees || – || || || — || Fenway Park || || – ||
|- style="text-align:center; background-color:
| 73 || June 19 || @ Twins || – || || || — || Target Field || || – ||
|- style="text-align:center; background-color:
| 74 || June 20 || @ Twins || – || || || — || Target Field || || – ||
|- style="text-align:center; background-color:
| 75 || June 21 || @ Twins || – || || || — || Target Field || || – ||
|- style="text-align:center; background-color:
| 76 || June 22 || @ Twins || – || || || — || Target Field || || – ||
|- style="text-align:center; background-color:
| 77 || June 23 || @ White Sox || – || || || — || Guaranteed Rate Field || || – ||
|- style="text-align:center; background-color:
| 78 || June 24 || @ White Sox || – || || || — || Guaranteed Rate Field || || – ||
|- style="text-align:center; background-color:
| 79 || June 25 || @ White Sox || – || || || — || Guaranteed Rate Field || || – ||
|- style="text-align:center; background-color:#f7e1d7;"
| 80 || June 27 || Marlins || – || || || — || Fenway Park || || – ||
|- style="text-align:center; background-color:#f7e1d7;"
| 81 || June 28 || Marlins || – || || || — || Fenway Park || || – ||
|- style="text-align:center; background-color:#f7e1d7;"
| 82 || June 29 || Marlins || – || || || — || Fenway Park || || – ||
|- style="text-align:center; background-color:
| 83 || June 30 || @ Blue Jays || – || || || — || Rogers Centre || || – ||
|-

|- style="text-align:center; background-color:
| 84 || July 1 || @ Blue Jays || – || || || — || Rogers Centre || || – ||
|- style="text-align:center; background-color:
| 85 || July 2 || @ Blue Jays || – || || || — || Rogers Centre || || – ||
|- style="text-align:center; background-color:#f7e1d7;"
| 86 || July 4 || Rangers || – || || || — || Fenway Park || || – ||
|- style="text-align:center; background-color:#f7e1d7;"
| 87 || July 5 || Rangers || – || || || — || Fenway Park || || – ||
|- style="text-align:center; background-color:#f7e1d7;"
| 88 || July 6 || Rangers || – || || || — || Fenway Park || || – ||
|- style="text-align:center; background-color:#f7e1d7;"
| 89 || July 7 || Athletics || – || || || — || Fenway Park || || – ||
|- style="text-align:center; background-color:#f7e1d7;"
| 90 || July 8 || Athletics || – || || || — || Fenway Park || || – ||
|- style="text-align:center; background-color:#f7e1d7;"
| 91 || July 9 || Athletics || – || || || — || Fenway Park || || – ||
|- style="text-align:center; background:#bbcaff
| ASG || July 11 || All-Star Game || NL – AL || || || — || T-Mobile Park || || – ||
|- style="text-align:center; background-color:
| 92 || July 14 || @ Cubs || – || || || — || Wrigley Field || || – ||
|- style="text-align:center; background-color:
| 93 || July 15 || @ Cubs || – || || || — || Wrigley Field || || – ||
|- style="text-align:center; background-color:
| 94 || July 16 || @ Cubs || – || || || — || Wrigley Field || || – ||
|- style="text-align:center; background-color:
| 95 || July 17 || @ Athletics || – || || || — || Oakland Coliseum || || – ||
|- style="text-align:center; background-color:
| 96 || July 18 || @ Athletics || – || || || — || Oakland Coliseum || || – ||
|- style="text-align:center; background-color:
| 97 || July 19 || @ Athletics || – || || || — || Oakland Coliseum || || – ||
|- style="text-align:center; background-color:#f7e1d7;"
| 98 || July 21 || Mets || – || || || — || Fenway Park || || – ||
|- style="text-align:center; background-color:#f7e1d7;"
| 99 || July 22 || Mets || – || || || — || Fenway Park || || – ||
|- style="text-align:center; background-color:#f7e1d7;"
| 100 || July 23 || Mets || – || || || — || Fenway Park || || – ||
|- style="text-align:center; background-color:#f7e1d7;"
| 101 || July 25 || Braves || – || || || — || Fenway Park || || – ||
|- style="text-align:center; background-color:#f7e1d7;"
| 102 || July 26 || Braves || – || || || — || Fenway Park || || – ||
|- style="text-align:center; background-color:
| 103 || July 28 || @ Giants || – || || || — || Oracle Park || || – ||
|- style="text-align:center; background-color:
| 104 || July 29 || @ Giants || – || || || — || Oracle Park || || – ||
|- style="text-align:center; background-color:
| 105 || July 30 || @ Giants || – || || || — || Oracle Park || || – ||
|- style="text-align:center; background-color:
| 106 || July 31 || @ Mariners || – || || || — || T-Mobile Park || || – ||
|-

|- style="text-align:center; background-color:
| 107 || August 1 || @ Mariners || – || || || — || T-Mobile Park || || – ||
|- style="text-align:center; background-color:
| 108 || August 2 || @ Mariners || – || || || — || T-Mobile Park || || – ||
|- style="text-align:center; background-color:#f7e1d7;"
| 109 || August 4 || Blue Jays || – || || || — || Fenway Park || || – ||
|- style="text-align:center; background-color:#f7e1d7;"
| 110 || August 5 || Blue Jays || – || || || — || Fenway Park || || – ||
|- style="text-align:center; background-color:#f7e1d7;"
| 111 || August 6 || Blue Jays || – || || || — || Fenway Park || || – ||
|- style="text-align:center; background-color:#f7e1d7;"
| 112 || August 7 || Royals || – || || || — || Fenway Park || || – ||
|- style="text-align:center; background-color:#f7e1d7;"
| 113 || August 8 || Royals || – || || || — || Fenway Park || || – ||
|- style="text-align:center; background-color:#f7e1d7;"
| 114 || August 9 || Royals || – || || || — || Fenway Park || || – ||
|- style="text-align:center; background-color:#f7e1d7;"
| 115 || August 10 || Royals || – || || || — || Fenway Park || || – ||
|- style="text-align:center; background-color:#f7e1d7;"
| 116 || August 11 || Tigers || – || || || — || Fenway Park || || – ||
|- style="text-align:center; background-color:#f7e1d7;"
| 117 || August 12 || Tigers || – || || || — || Fenway Park || || – ||
|- style="text-align:center; background-color:#f7e1d7;"
| 118 || August 13 || Tigers || – || || || — || Fenway Park || || – ||
|- style="text-align:center; background-color:
| 119 || August 15 || @ Nationals || – || || || — || Nationals Park || || – ||
|- style="text-align:center; background-color:
| 120 || August 16 || @ Nationals || – || || || — || Nationals Park || || – ||
|- style="text-align:center; background-color:
| 121 || August 17 || @ Nationals || – || || || — || Nationals Park || || – ||
|- style="text-align:center; background-color:
| 122 || August 18 || @ Yankees || – || || || — || Yankee Stadium || || – ||
|- style="text-align:center; background-color:
| 123 || August 19 || @ Yankees || – || || || — || Yankee Stadium || || – ||
|- style="text-align:center; background-color:
| 124 || August 20 || @ Yankees || – || || || — || Yankee Stadium || || – ||
|- style="text-align:center; background-color:
| 125 || August 21 || @ Astros || – || || || — || Minute Maid Park || || – ||
|- style="text-align:center; background-color:
| 126 || August 22 || @ Astros || – || || || — || Minute Maid Park || || – ||
|- style="text-align:center; background-color:
| 127 || August 23 || @ Astros || – || || || — || Minute Maid Park || || – ||
|- style="text-align:center; background-color:
| 128 || August 24 || @ Astros || – || || || — || Minute Maid Park || || – ||
|- style="text-align:center; background-color:#f7e1d7;"
| 129 || August 25 || Dodgers || – || || || — || Fenway Park || || – ||
|- style="text-align:center; background-color:#f7e1d7;"
| 130 || August 26 || Dodgers || – || || || — || Fenway Park || || – ||
|- style="text-align:center; background-color:#f7e1d7;"
| 131 || August 27 || Dodgers || – || || || — || Fenway Park || || – ||
|- style="text-align:center; background-color:#f7e1d7;"
| 132 || August 28 || Astros || – || || || — || Fenway Park || || – ||
|- style="text-align:center; background-color:#f7e1d7;"
| 133 || August 29 || Astros || – || || || — || Fenway Park || || – ||
|- style="text-align:center; background-color:#f7e1d7;"
| 134 || August 30 || Astros || – || || || — || Fenway Park || || – ||
|-

|- style="text-align:center; background-color:
| 135 || September 1 || @ Royals || – || || || — || Kauffman Stadium || || – ||
|- style="text-align:center; background-color:
| 136 || September 2 || @ Royals || – || || || — || Kauffman Stadium || || – ||
|- style="text-align:center; background-color:
| 137 || September 3 || @ Royals || – || || || — || Kauffman Stadium || || – ||
|- style="text-align:center; background-color:
| 138 || September 4 || @ Rays || – || || || — || Tropicana Field || || – ||
|- style="text-align:center; background-color:
| 139 || September 5 || @ Rays || – || || || — || Tropicana Field || || – ||
|- style="text-align:center; background-color:
| 140 || September 6 || @ Rays || – || || || — || Tropicana Field || || – ||
|- style="text-align:center; background-color:#f7e1d7;"
| 141 || September 8 || Orioles || – || || || — || Fenway Park || || – ||
|- style="text-align:center; background-color:#f7e1d7;"
| 142 || September 9 || Orioles || – || || || — || Fenway Park || || – ||
|- style="text-align:center; background-color:#f7e1d7;"
| 143 || September 10 || Orioles || – || || || — || Fenway Park || || – ||
|- style="text-align:center; background-color:#f7e1d7;"
| 144 || September 11 || Yankees || – || || || — || Fenway Park || || – ||
|- style="text-align:center; background-color:#f7e1d7;"
| 145 || September 12 || Yankees || – || || || — || Fenway Park || || – ||
|- style="text-align:center; background-color:#f7e1d7;"
| 146 || September 13 || Yankees || – || || || — || Fenway Park || || – ||
|- style="text-align:center; background-color:#f7e1d7;"
| 147 || September 14 || Yankees || – || || || — || Fenway Park || || – ||
|- style="text-align:center; background-color:
| 148 || September 15 || @ Blue Jays || – || || || — || Rogers Centre || || – ||
|- style="text-align:center; background-color:
| 149 || September 16 || @ Blue Jays || – || || || — || Rogers Centre || || – ||
|- style="text-align:center; background-color:
| 150 || September 17 || @ Blue Jays || – || || || — || Rogers Centre || || – ||
|- style="text-align:center; background-color:
| 151 || September 18 || @ Rangers || – || || || — || Globe Life Field || || – ||
|- style="text-align:center; background-color:
| 152 || September 19 || @ Rangers || – || || || — || Globe Life Field || || – ||
|- style="text-align:center; background-color:
| 153 || September 20 || @ Rangers || – || || || — || Globe Life Field || || – ||
|- style="text-align:center; background-color:#f7e1d7;"
| 154 || September 22 || White Sox || – || || || — || Fenway Park || || – ||
|- style="text-align:center; background-color:#f7e1d7;"
| 155 || September 23 || White Sox || – || || || — || Fenway Park || || – ||
|- style="text-align:center; background-color:#f7e1d7;"
| 156 || September 24 || White Sox || – || || || — || Fenway Park || || – ||
|- style="text-align:center; background-color:#f7e1d7;"
| 157 || September 26 || Rays || – || || || — || Fenway Park || || – ||
|- style="text-align:center; background-color:#f7e1d7;"
| 158 || September 27 || Rays || – || || || — || Fenway Park || || – ||
|- style="text-align:center; background-color:
| 159 || September 28 || @ Orioles || – || || || — || Camden Yards || || – ||
|- style="text-align:center; background-color:
| 160 || September 29 || @ Orioles || – || || || — || Camden Yards || || – ||
|- style="text-align:center; background-color:
| 161 || September 30 || @ Orioles || – || || || — || Camden Yards || || – ||
|- style="text-align:center; background-color:
| 162 || October 1 || @ Orioles || – || || || — || Camden Yards || || – ||
|-

Current roster

Farm system

Luke Montz, who managed the Salem Red Sox during the 2021 and 2022 seasons, left the Red Sox organization in October 2022. The team announced US-based minor-league staff assignments on January 27.

Note: Divisions reflect 2022 scheduling and are subject to change.

References

Further reading

External links
 2023 Boston Red Sox season at Official Site

Boston Red Sox
Red Sox
Boston Red Sox
Boston Red Sox seasons